Rise of the Blood Legion: Greatest Hits (Chapter 1) is the first compilation album by American rock band In This Moment. It was released by Century Media on May 4, 2015.

Background
The compilation comprises the band's four releases through Century Media. Material from their 2014 album, Black Widow, is not included. The track listing was helmed by the band themselves. The DVD (US version only) contains all of their music videos except "Call Me" and anything from the Black Widow album. The title refers to the bands loyal fan base, which have been dubbed "The Blood Legion", also the title of the thirteenth track off 2012's Blood.

The album cover was revealed online on March 21, 2015.

Track listing

DVD (U.S. only)

Personnel
In This Moment
 Maria Brink – lead vocals, piano
 Chris Howorth – lead guitar, backing vocals
 Blake Bunzel – rhythm guitar on tracks 2-4, 6, 8-10
 Jeff Fabb – drums on tracks 2-4, 6, 8-10
 Kyle Konkiel – bass guitar on tracks 8-10
 Tom Hane – drums on tracks 12-14, 16-18
 Randy Weitzel – rhythm guitar on tracks 12-14, 16-18
 Travis Johnson – bass guitar on tracks 12-14, 16-18
 Jesse Landry – bass guitar on tracks 2-4, 6

Additional personnel
 Adrian Patrick – additional vocals on "The Promise"
 Mitchell Marlow – additional guitar, programming on "Burn" and "The Blood Legion"
 Ivan Moody – additional vocals on "Adrenalize"
 Kane Churko – additional engineering, additional production
 Kevin Churko – mastering, mixing, production, recording
 Eric Rachel – production

References

2015 compilation albums
In This Moment albums